The Lake Macquarie News was a small, independent weekly community newspaper serving the City of Lake Macquarie area in New South Wales and owned by the Cumberland Newspaper Group, a News Limited subsidiary. It was originally the Belmont-Swansea Gazette through the 1940s but merged with the Lake Macquarie Advocate; it was rechristened with its current name in 1992. This publication was the sole one which exclusively concerns itself with Lake Macquarie as other papers cover larger areas. The newspaper operated the Lake Macquarie News Business Achiever Awards which were based on votes from readers. The paper had a circulation of 52,461.

The newspaper ceased operation in June 2008.

References

Defunct newspapers published in New South Wales
Weekly newspapers published in Australia